Kaarlo Jalmari Tuominen (9 February 1908 – 20 October 2006) was a Finnish runner. He had his best achievements in the 3000 m steeplechase, winning a silver medal at the 1936 Olympics and placing fourth at the 1938 European Championships. He worked as a police officer in Helsinki.

References

External links 

 

1908 births
2006 deaths
People from Somero
People from Häme Province (Grand Duchy of Finland)
Athletes (track and field) at the 1936 Summer Olympics
Finnish male long-distance runners
Olympic athletes of Finland
Olympic silver medalists for Finland
Finnish male steeplechase runners
Medalists at the 1936 Summer Olympics
Olympic silver medalists in athletics (track and field)
Sportspeople from Southwest Finland